Karidhya is a census town in Suri I CD block in Suri Sadar subdivision of Birbhum district in the Indian state of West Bengal.

Geography

CD block HQ
The headquarters of Suri I CD block are located at Karidhya.

Demographics
As per the 2011 Census of India, Karidhya had a total population of 10,466 of which 5,325 (51%) were males and 5,141 (49%) were females. Population below 6 years was 1,038. The total number of literates in Karidhya was 8,005 (84.91% of the population over 6 years).

Infrastructure
As per the District Census Handbook 2011, Karidhya covered an area of 2.4489 km2. The nearest railway station is at Suri 4 km away. Buses are available in the town. It has 9 km roads and open drains. The major source of protected water supply is from bore well pumping and over head tank. There are 872 domestic electric connections. Amongst the medical facilities it has are 1 medicine shop. Amongst the educational facilities it has are 6 primary schools, 1 middle school, 1 secondary school and 1 senior secondary school. The nearest general degree college is at Suri. Amongst the recreational and cultural facilities it has 1 working women’s hostel, 1 public library and 1 reading room. It has the branch of 1 non-agricultural credit society. Amongst the commodities it produces are handloom goods, conch shell products and sal leaf plates.

Transport
State Highway 6 (locally popular as Saptagram, Tribeni, Kalna, Katwa Road or STKK), running from Rajnagar (in Birbhum district) to Alampur (in Howrah district), passes through Karidhya.

Post office
Karidhya has a delivery sub post office, with PIN 731126, under Suri head office. Branch offices having the same PIN are  Bhabanipur, Ganeshpur, Ghatdurlavpur, Gohaliara, Madhaipur, Nagari, Paruliahazrapur, Patadanga, Patharchapuri, Rajganj, Rautara, Sajina, Tabadurga and Tantipara.

Culture
Karidhya Town Library, a government-sponsored library, was established in 1953. It has its own pucca building.

References

Cities and towns in Birbhum district